Lernagorts Vardenis Football Club, is a defunct Armenian football club from Vardenis, Gegharkunik Province. The club was dissolved in 1995 and is currently inactive from professional football.

League Record

References

Defunct football clubs in Armenia
1995 disestablishments in Armenia